The men's light middleweight event was part of the boxing programme at the 1956 Summer Olympics.  The weight class was allowed boxers of up to 71 kilograms to compete. The competition was held from 24 November to 1 December 1956. 14 boxers from 14 nations competed.

Medalists

Results

First round
 Boris Nikolov (BUL) def. Muhammad Safdar (PAK), PTS
 Zbigniew Pietrzykowski (POL) def. Rychard Karpov (URS), PTS
 Ulrich Kienast (FRG) def. James Montgomery (CAN), PTS
 John McCormack (GBR) def. Alexander Webster (RSA), PTS
 José Torres (USA) def. Peter Read (AUS), PTS
 Franco Scisciani (ITA) def. Eugène Legrand (FRA), PTS

Quarterfinals
 László Papp (HUN) def. Alberto Sáenz (ARG), RSC-3
 Zbigniew Pietrzykowski (POL) def. Boris Nikolov (BUL), PTS
 John McCormack (GBR) def. Ulrich Kienast (FRG), RSC-3
 José Torres (USA) def. Franco Scisciani (ITA), PTS

Semifinals
 László Papp (HUN) def. Zbigniew Pietrzykowski (POL), PTS
 José Torres (USA) def. John McCormack (GBR), PTS

Final
 László Papp (HUN) def. José Torres (USA), PTS

References

 https://web.archive.org/web/20080912181829/http://www.la84foundation.org/6oic/OfficialReports/1956/OR1956.pdf

Light Middleweight